You're Not a Monster is an adult animated series created by Frank Lesser, and voiced by Kelsey Grammer, Eric Stonestreet, Patton Oswalt, Ellie Kemper and Aparna Nancherla. The series premiered on October 10, 2019 on IMDb's streaming service (now renamed Freevee).

The series is currently unavailable on IMDb and Amazon Prime Video as of December 2022.

Premise
In the series, You're Not a Monster, "Kelsey Grammer will take a seat in the therapist chair for the first time since his Frasier days as former psychiatrist-turned-vampire who mentors his great-great grandson Max," played by Eric Stonestreet, "a therapist who has inherited his practice."

Cast
 Kelsey Grammer as John Seward, Max's great-great grandfather who was turned into a vampire by Count Dracula. He gives helpful advice for Max.
 Eric Stonestreet as Max Seward, the great-great-grandson of John Seward who is a psychiatrist for monsters. He is nursing a broken heart over his ex-girlfriend, Elsa.
 Aparna Nancherla as Nia Emissiona, Max's secretary who has the ability to transform into a demon.
 Patton Oswalt as The Invisible Man, a patient of Max's who just wants to be seen (emotionally).
 Ellie Kemper as Elsa Brenner, Max's ex-girlfriend.
 Adam Pally as Zombie
 Amy Sedaris
 Milana Vayntrub
 Peter Grosz
 Joel Kim Booster
 Amber Ruffin
 Langston Kerman

Production
On July 9, 2019, IMDb announced its first ever scripted series featuring the voices of Kelsey Grammer, Eric Stonestreet, Patton Oswalt, Ellie Kemper and Aparna Nancherla.

The series is written and created by Frank Lesser, and is executive produced by Kelsey Grammer, Frank Lesser, Brad T. Gottfred, Jordan McMahon, Corey Moss and Tom Russo. Production companies involved with this series are Grammnet Productions, Bold Soul Studios and Ranker.

References

External links

2019 American television series debuts
2010s American adult animated television series
American adult animated comedy television series
American adult animated horror television series
English-language television shows